Li Ju may refer to:

Li Ju (Jin dynasty) (died 325), military general and warlord of the Jin dynasty
Li Ju (table tennis) (born 1976), Chinese table tennis player
Li Ju (footballer) (born 2002), Chinese footballer
Ju Li (born 1975), Chinese-American nuclear engineer